Physics Today is the membership magazine of the American Institute of Physics. First published in May 1948, it is issued on a monthly schedule, and is provided to the members of ten physics societies, including the American Physical Society. It is also available to non-members as a paid annual subscription.

The magazine informs readers about important developments in overview articles written by experts, shorter review articles written internally by staff, and also discusses issues and events of importance to the science community in politics, education, and other fields. The magazine provides a historical resource of events associated with physics. For example it discussed debunking the physics of the Star Wars program of the 1980s, and the state of physics in China and the Soviet Union during the 1950s and 1970s.

According to the Journal Citation Reports, the journal has a 2017 impact factor of 4.370.

References

External links
 

American Institute of Physics academic journals
Monthly magazines published in the United States
Science and technology magazines published in the United States
English-language magazines
Magazines established in 1948
Magazines published in New York (state)
Physics magazines